Mohammad Bagheri (born 1971) is an Iranian Shiite cleric and politician.

Bagheri was born in Najaf from Iranian Azerbaijanis family. He is a member of the 9th Islamic Consultative Assembly from the electorate of Bonab. Bagheri won with 33,912 (44.76%) votes.

References

People from East Azerbaijan Province
People from Najaf
Deputies of Bonab
Living people
1971 births
Members of the 9th Islamic Consultative Assembly
Followers of Wilayat fraction members